Adewale Oladoye (born 25 August 2001) is a Nigerian footballer who plays for Slovak club Trenčín.

Club career
He made his Belgian First Division A debut for Gent on 19 May 2021 in a game against Standard Liège. He scored his first goal for Gent on 5 August 2021 in a Conference League qualifier against RFS.

On 6 July 2022, Oladoye signed with Trenčín in Slovakia.

References

External links
 

2001 births
Living people
Nigerian footballers
Association football midfielders
K.A.A. Gent players
AS Trenčín players
Belgian Pro League players
Slovak Super Liga players
Nigerian expatriate footballers
Expatriate footballers in Belgium
Nigerian expatriate sportspeople in Belgium
Expatriate footballers in Slovakia
Nigerian expatriate sportspeople in Slovakia